Catherine Snow may refer to:
Catherine Mandeville Snow, last woman hanged in Newfoundland, Canada
Catherine E. Snow, educational psychologist and language acquisition researcher